Whitnall Park is Milwaukee County, Wisconsin's largest park and it is located in Hales Corners, Wisconsin. The park was named for Charles B. Whitnall and planning for the park began in 1924. Major work in the park was completed during the Great Depression through the Public Works Administration.

History
The planning for the park began in 1924, and the park was referred to as The park was named for Charles B. Whitnall Park. Whitnall was called the father of the Milwaukee County Park System. The plans for the park called for a golf course, picnic areas and an Arboretum. Many of park's structures, were constructed during the 1930s and much of the park labor was provided by the Civilian Conservation Corps program. Much of the landscaping was completed between 1935 and 1927 by The National Youth Association; the group was active in the park working on the gardens and picnic areas.

The park is   and it was originally called Hales Corners Park. The park covers one square mile making it Milwaukee County's largest park.

Park features 
Boerner Botanical Gardens which were The named for Alfred Boerner: the designer of the original gardens. 
Wehr Nature Center which is a 220 acre section of protected land in Whitnall Park.
The park contains the state's oldest sugar maples (270 years) and other unique trees.

See also
Parks of Milwaukee

References

Milwaukee County, Wisconsin
Parks in Wisconsin
County parks in Wisconsin
Protected areas of Milwaukee County, Wisconsin
Urban public parks
Geography of Milwaukee
Tourist attractions in Milwaukee